Tofino is a town of approximately 2,516 residents on the west coast of Vancouver Island in the Canadian province of British Columbia. The District of Tofino is located at the western terminus of Highway 4 on the tip of the Esowista Peninsula at the southern edge of Clayoquot Sound.  It is situated in the traditional territory of the Tla-o-qui-aht First Nations.

A popular year-round tourism destination, Tofino's summer population swells to many times its winter size. It attracts surfers, hikers, nature lovers, bird watchers, campers, whale watchers, fishers, or anyone just looking to be close to nature. Despite its small population, the town attracts a number of chefs and culinary professionals, which has resulted in a burgeoning choice of restaurants and specialty shops. In the winter, it is not as bustling, although many people visit Tofino and the West Coast to watch storms on the water. Close to Tofino is Long Beach, a scenic and popular year-round destination, in Pacific Rim National Park Reserve. With its natural hot springs, Maquinna Marine Provincial Park is a popular day-trip destination for tourists.

Etymology

The settlement acquired its name in 1909 with the opening of the Tofino Post Office, named after the nearby Tofino Inlet. This geographical feature had been named in 1792 by the Spanish explorers Galiano and Valdés, in honour of Admiral Vicente Tofiño de San Miguel y Wanderiales (or Vanderiales), under whom Galiano had learned cartography.

Demographics 

Religion 
According to the 2021 census, religious groups in Tofino included:
Irreligion (1,795 persons or 80.5%)
Christianity (385 persons or 17.3%)
Indigenous Spirituality (10 persons or 0.4%)
Other (10 persons or 0.4%)

Transportation
Floatplanes land on the inlet in town. Coastal fog is a common morning phenomenon in the summer, complicating access by air until the weather clears.

Tofino is located at the western end of Highway 4 that connects the community with Port Alberni and the population centres on the east coast of Vancouver Island.  There are no roads connecting Tofino along the west coast of Vancouver Island, except to the nearby community of Ucluelet. A monument in the city declares Tofino to be the western terminus of the Trans-Canada Highway as part of a 1940s campaign by local residents; the highway ends instead in Victoria at the terminus of Highway 1.

Boat services connect Tofino with coastal communities such as Ahousat and Hot Springs Cove. Wildlife-watching tour boats operate in the area. In October 2015, a whale watching vessel capsized off the coast of Tofino, which resulted in the deaths of six passengers.

Culture

Festivities and events

Every March, the migration of thousands of grey whales is celebrated with the Pacific Rim Whale Festival. The last weekend of April has, up until 2020, been the Tofino Shorebird Festival. The first weekend of June, for 14 years, brought the Tofino Food and Wine Festival, featuring British Columbia wines and showcasing the creations of Tofino chefs.  The Tofino Market takes place on the Village Green on every Saturday, from the Victoria Day long weekend through early October.  The Tofino Lantern Festival (voted Tofino's most popular event by Tofino Time Magazine), was a Raincoast Education Society fundraiser each August, with its cancellation announced in 2021.   Since 2018, early September has the week-long Race for The Blue Tuna Shoot-Out hosted by Tofino Resort + Marina, and Queen of the Peak Women's Surf Championship typically takes place toward the end of the month.  In 2010, the O'Neill Coldwater Surf Classic took place on Cox Bay Beach, as the first professional ASP surf event ever held in Canada, with Tofino surfer Pete Devries winning the competition. November has typically hosted the Clayoquot Oyster Festival,.  Rip Curl Pro Tofino, the official Canadian surfing championship, has been held each year in May, since 2007.

Poole's Land
Between 1988 and 2020, Tofino was home to Poole's Land, an ecovillage and "Hippie Commune" run on Anarchist principles. The Commune provided free accommodation to seasonal workers who would come to Tofino in the summer months as well as being a centre of counterculture in the region.

Freedom Cove
Located within the Tofino vicinity is the man-made floating Island of Freedom Cove. Constructed by Wayne Adams and Catherine King in 1992, the mostly wooden structure is both home to Adams and King as well as a tourist attraction and an art gallery. Freedom Cove attempts to live as sustainably as possible by such means as by using solar power, recycling waste, composting, drinking rainwater, and eating locally grown or caught food.

Climate

The climate is marine west coast (Köppen: Cfb,  clearly included in the temperate zone). Precipitation is concentrated in the winter, which is a characteristic of Coastal British Columbia; however, the annual amount of  far exceeds nearby areas.

Proximity to the Pacific Ocean keeps temperatures cool in the summer and mild in the winter. Compared to the Canadian city of Winnipeg, Manitoba, which rests on a similar latitude, Tofino's average high temperature is 6.8 degrees cooler in the summer and a whopping 19.4 degrees warmer in the winter.

Nearly all of the precipitation that falls throughout the year is rain, with 203 days with rain and only 7.8 days with snowfall. Due to its location on the westernmost part of Vancouver Island, Tofino faces the Pacific Ocean, unimpeded by any mountains to the west (and therefore not subject to a rain shadow effect like much of the eastern island and the BC interior). Winter cyclonic storms frequently pass over the town deluging it with rain, making it one of the wettest locations in Canada. The month of November alone brings more precipitation to Tofino than that received for an entire year in parts of the BC interior such as Kamloops and Penticton. Like the rest of coastal BC, summer brings relative dryness; even so, it still receives much more summertime precipitation than the interior (which can often be susceptible to drought-like conditions until the onset of autumn).

Telecommunications
Tofino has modern cell phone and land line access (including Internet and ADSL).

Media
Tofino has one newspaper, the Tofino-Ucluelet Westerly News. Tofino Time is a monthly magazine that publishes local new and articles about Tofino and the surrounding areas. CHMZ-FM on 90.1 FM, nicknamed Tuff City radio, is a local radio station. Tofino also receives CBC Radio One via CBXZ-FM on 91.5 FM.

Health and education
Public education is offered by the School District 70 Alberni, through the Wickaninnish Community School in Tofino and Ucluelet Secondary School in Ucluelet.  The town's hospital is the Tofino General Hospital, operated by the Vancouver Island Health Authority (VIHA).

Cultural references

Music
 Montreal third wave ska band The Planet Smashers recorded a song on their album Life of the Party entitled "Surfin' in Tofino".
 Canadian band Prairie Dance Club recorded a song entitled "Tofino".

Film and television
 Tofino was a filming location for The Twilight Saga: New Moon in March and April 2009.  South Beach, located near Wickaninnish Beach inside Pacific Rim National Park Reserve, and Incinerator Rock at Long Beach were used.
Tofino was also a filming location for the third installment of the new Planet of the Apes movie series called War for the Planet of the Apes. Long Beach and surrounding areas inside Pacific Rim National Park were used as filming locations.
In the Canadian film One Week, main character Ben Tyler (played by Joshua Jackson) rides his motorcycle from Toronto, Ontario to Tofino, British Columbia.
Tofino was one of the many filming locations for the movie The Big Year starring Jack Black, Owen Wilson and Steve Martin. It filmed several scenes in the town of Tofino at Schooner Restaurant and 4th street dock in the harbour. 
 Going the Distance, a 2004 teen comedy film with a group of friends going on a road-trip starting from Tofino beach  heading to Toronto.

Notable people 
 Andrew Oye (born May 10, 1974), composer

References

External links

Populated places on the British Columbia Coast
District municipalities in British Columbia
Populated places in the Alberni-Clayoquot Regional District
Surfing locations in Canada
Clayoquot Sound region
Articles containing video clips